The 1959 International cricket season was from April 1959 to August 1959.

Season overview

June

India in England

July

Denmark in Netherlands

References

1959 in cricket